TV Oeste (channel 5) is a television station licensed to Barreiras, Bahia, Brazil affiliated with TV Globo. Owned by Rede Bahia, TV Oeste is part of Rede Bahia de Televisão, a statewide television network composed of another five TV stations. TV Oeste's studios are located on Marechal Deodoro Street in the Vila Brasil district, on Barreiras, and its transmitter is located atop Serra da Bandeira.

History
TV Oeste signed on for the first time on February 2, 1991. It was the first television station to be inaugurated in Barreiras and the western region of Bahia, being too the last Rede Bahia station to sign on. The first anchor to appear on the station's programming was journalist Denise Mesquita, who anchored a special inaugural program about the western region of Bahia.

In 2004, TV Oeste installed regional offices in the cities of Luís Eduardo Magalhães and Bom Jesus da Lapa, expanding journalistic coverage and business possibilities in important centers of its coverage area.

In February 2010, the station had its license renewed for more 15 years.

On February 3, 2012, the headquarters of TV Oeste was targeted by vandals. The criminals, who had carried out acts of vandalism in various establishments, such as banks and stores, shoted at the station's frontage and entrance door. The crime occurred shortly after the Association of Military Police of the West of Bahia joined the strike of the Military Police of Bahia.

On May 23, 2014, TV Oeste opened a new branch in Luís Eduardo Magalhães, in a ceremony that was attended by authorities and had live entries by reporter Carlos Augusto on the local edition of newscast BATV.

On March 2, 2015, TV Oeste produced for the last time the Bahia Meio Dia regional news block.

On May 6, 2019, Rede Bahia announced the interruption of the station's newscast production activities, taking down the regional versions of the local newscasts Jornal da Manhã and BATV, causing TV Oeste to fully broadcast the newscasts produced by TV Bahia in Salvador. Many employees were fired, with only the technical marketing team, some cameramen and reporters being retained. The station continued to produce reports for state and nationalwide newscasts and maintained commercial breaks as usual, in addition to producing local editions of the news update bulletin Bahia Agora.

On January 16, 2021, TV Oeste premiered the local version of the local infomercial program Oferta na Rede, created by TV Bahia, with the presentation of Tássia Peixoto. On August 21, another special local program debuts on the station: Oeste Agora, with the presentation of Victor Silveira, which in its 3 editions, broadcast after Mosaico Baiano, had as theme the real estate sector in the region.

On October 13, 2021, the station officially announces the resume of local newscasts production after two years, through the return of the local edition of Bahia Meio Dia, anchored by Carlos Augusto. The premiere happened on October 25.

Digital television

Digital channels

Analog-to-digital conversion
The station activated its digital signal in April 2014 and officially launched it on May 20, in an event with the presence of the board of Rede Bahia and more than 400 guests.

TV Oeste will shut down its analog signal, over VHF channel 5, on December 31, 2023, following ANATEL's official schedule, as part of the federally mandated transition from analog to digital television.

News operation
TV Oeste currently broadcasts 5 hours of locally produced newscasts each week (with 40 minutes each weekday, through the local edition of noon newscast Bahia Meio Dia, anchored by Carlos Augusto), in addition to the news update bulletin Bahia Agora, with reports by Carlos Augusto, Lo-Hanna Nunes and Marta Ortega. The station formerly produced the local editions of newscasts BATV and Jornal da Manhã.

See also

 Rede Bahia de Televisão
 TV Globo

References

External links
 
 Institucional page
 G1 - Bahia (news)
 GE - Bahia (sports)
 
 

TV Globo affiliates
Companies based in Bahia
Television channels and stations established in 1991
1991 establishments in Brazil